Nathan Riddles (February 4, 1952 – August 11, 1991} was an American blues harmonica player who played an important role in the New York blues scene during the late 1970s to mid-1980s.  Born in Bronxville, a Westchester County suburb of New York, he was educated at Brooklyn College and the Pratt Institute.  In the early 1980s, he became known in New York blues circles for his street performances with the guitarist Charlie Hilbert, as part of a free-form duo that he labeled 'El Cafe Street.'

Riddles performed with Larry Johnson, Screamin' Jay Hawkins, Bill Dicey, and Odetta as well as Hilbert.  He recorded several albums with Johnson (one produced by Len Kunstadt for Spivey Records, one produced by Horst Lippmann) and a solo album on Spivey entitled The Artistry of Nat Riddles.  He also contributed several cuts to a Spivey series of LPs entitled New York Really has The Blues. Riddles also gave some lessons to Adam Gussow.

There are images of Nat Riddles in the archives of photographer, Marilyn Nance.  

Riddles died of leukemia in August 1991 in Richmond, Virginia at the age of 39.

In 2007, the Modern Blues Harmonica record label issued a compilation album of Riddles, entitled El Cafe Street Live!

References

Bibliography
Gussow, Adam - Mister Satan's Apprentice:  A Blues Memoir (Pantheon Books, 1998).

External links
Nat Riddles discography
Nat Riddles and Charlie Hilbert:  El Cafe Street Live!

1952 births
1991 deaths
People from Bronxville, New York
American blues harmonica players
Deaths from leukemia
20th-century American musicians
Brooklyn College alumni